Dimitrios Amarantidis (born 27 July 1986) is a Greek professional footballer who plays as a left back for Super League 2 club Apollon Pontus, for which he is captain.

Career
After playing for Veria for five seasons, Amarantidis' contract expired on 30 June 2015.

Honours

Veria
Football League (Greece): Runner-up: 2011-12

References

External links
 

1986 births
Living people
Footballers from Kozani
Greek footballers
Delta Ethniki players
Gamma Ethniki players
Super League Greece players
Football League (Greece) players
Super League Greece 2 players
Trikala F.C. players
AEK Athens F.C. players
Veria F.C. players
Agrotikos Asteras F.C. players
Apollon Pontou FC players
Anagennisi Karditsa F.C. players
Association football fullbacks